Dana Nikola Ņikitina (born 25 March 1999) is a Latvian footballer who plays as a defender for Sieviešu Futbola Līga club Rīgas FS and the Latvia women's national team.

Club career
Ņikitina has played for Rīgas FS in Latvia at the UEFA Women's Champions League.

International career
Ņikitina capped for Latvia at senior level during the UEFA Women's Euro 2022 qualifying.

References

1999 births
Living people
Latvian women's footballers
Women's association football defenders
Rīgas FS players
Latvia women's youth international footballers
Latvia women's international footballers